Wilton Lines (fl. 1889–1890) was an English professional footballer born in Birmingham. Lines played seven games for Small Heath in the inaugural 1889–90 season of the Football Alliance, covering a variety of forward positions, but was unable to displace the established forwards.

References

Year of birth missing
Year of death missing
Footballers from Birmingham, West Midlands
English footballers
Association football forwards
Birmingham City F.C. players
Place of death missing
Football Alliance players